Earl Kenneth Fernandes (born September 21, 1972) is Catholic prelate who has served as the 13th Bishop of Columbus in Ohio since 2022. 

Fernandes is the first Indian-American bishop of the Latin Church in the United States, the first person of color to serve as the bishop of the Diocese of Columbus, and the youngest diocesan bishop in the United States.

Biography

Early life 
Earl  Fernandes was born on September 21, 1972, in Toledo, Ohio, to Sydney Oswald and Thelma ( Noronha) Fernandes. His mother and father were born in Goa and Mangalore, respectively, but raised in Mumbai, all in India.  The family emigrated to the United States in 1971. Sydney worked as a physician, being granted a green card in part due to the need for doctors in America during the time around the Vietnam War. Thelma was a teacher. Fernandes has four brothers, one of whom is a deacon in the Ukrainian Greek Catholic Church. 

Fernandes recalls that his spiritual formation was fostered by the love of the Christian faith his parents inculcated in him. Thelma started every day with a morning offering prayer.   When the family went to visit Sydney working at St. Charles Hospital in Oregon, Ohio, they often found him praying in the hospital chapel in his spare time. He often offered free medical care to patients.

The Fernandes family attended St. Thomas Aquinas Church on the east side of Toledo, a working-class church that Fernandes says was like a second home to him. He also attended parochial school at St. Thomas. Fernandes attended St. Francis De Sales School, graduating as salutatorian in 1990.

Fernandes earned a bachelor's degree in biology from the University of Toledo in 1994 and later studied physiology for a year at the University of Salford in Salford, England. During a trip to Rome in 1995, he began to feel called to the priesthood through an experience he had in prayer at the Tomb of Saint Peter in the Vatican. Like his four brothers, Fernandes was accepted into medical school and studied medicine for two years at the University of Cincinnati in Cincinnati, Ohio. He left there to enter Casa Balthazar, a house of discernment in Rome, and in 1997, he entered seminary studies at Mount Saint Mary's of the West in Cincinnati. Fernandes was ordained a deacon on September 29, 2001, and earned master's degrees in theology and divinity in 2002.

Priesthood 

Fernandes was ordained a priest for the Archdiocese of Cincinnati on May 18, 2002, by Archbishop Daniel Pilarczyk at the Cathedral Basilica of St. Peter in Chains in Cincinnati. His first pastoral assignment was as vicar of Holy Angels Parish and a teacher at Lehman Catholic High School in Sydney, Ohio. In 2004, Fernandes went to Rome to study at the Alphonsian Academy, attaining his licentiate in moral theology in 2006 and a doctorate in moral theology with a concentration in bioethics in November 2007. During this time, he encountered the lay ecclesial movement of Communion and Liberation, and was deeply impacted by it. His episcopal motto is drawn from a prayer of the movement. While in Rome, Fernandes was also trained as an exorcist. 

Back in Ohio, Fernandes  taught at Mount Saint Mary's Seminary in Cincinnati and served as the academic dean there. In 2013, he published a book, Seminary Formation and Homosexuality, with the Institute for Priestly Formation.  It  defended Pope Benedict XVI's ban of the admission of gay men to Catholic seminaries.

Fernandes served as parochial administrator of Sacred Heart Parish from July 2014 to March 2016. There he celebrated the Tridentine Mass along with masses in Italian and English. He said most in attendance at the Latin Mass were young people ... Looking for reverence and beauty, a sense of transcendence, and to be connected to their parents and grandparents, the generations of faith... The Latin Mass is also quiet. There’s so much noise and business in our lives. They enter into the liturgies interiorly and love it for its tradition, the Faith of their fathers. Fernandes was also named a Missionary of Mercy by Pope Francis for the Extraordinary Jubilee of Mercy that year.

In 2016, Fernandes began to serve as a secretary to the Apostolic Nuncio to the United States, first to Archbishop Carlo Viganò and then Archbishop Christophe Pierre.

Fernandes served as the pastor of St. Ignatius Loyola Parish in Cincinnati from 2019 to 2022. Fernandes became pastor of the parish after his predecessor was accused of a rape. Parishioners at St. Ignatius spoke highly of him and his management of the parish following the crisis.

Fernandes is a fourth-degree knight of columbus, as well as a member of the National Catholic Bioethics Center in Philadelphia, Pennsylvania.  He has served as a judge on the archdiocesan marriage tribunal, and as a board member of the Pontifical College Josephinum.

Bishop of Columbus 

On April 2, 2022, Fernandes was appointed 13th bishop of the Diocese of Columbus by Pope Francis, with his episcopal consecration and installation by Archbishop Dennis Schnurr occurring on May 31, 2022 at St. Paul the Apostle Church in Westerville, Ohio. Fernandes is the first Indian American bishop to serve in the Latin Church in the United States, as well as the first person of color to serve as head of the Diocese of Columbus. Fernandes is the fourth bishop of Columbus who was initially ordained as a priest for the Archdiocese of Cincinnati. At his consecration as bishop, Fernandes was the youngest ordinary bishop in the United States.

Fernandes indicated his intention to continue the "Real Presence Real Future" initiative of his predecessor, Bishop Robert J. Brennan. The initiative "aims to determine how to maintain a strong Catholic presence in the diocese’s 23 counties and make the best use of its resources." The process was expected to result in some parishes closing. Fernandes aided in similar efforts for the Archdiocese of Cincinnati before being moved to Columbus. 

One of Fernandes' first actions as bishop was to install a diocesan priest at the Newman Center of the Ohio State University in Columbus. According to the diocese, the Paulist Fathers operating the ministry would be permitted to remain under the new pastor, but the Paulist leadership declined and some parishioners issued complaints regarding the Fernandes' decision. The Paulist Fathers, who had managed the ministry for 65 years, were replaced as part of what the diocese termed as an effort to align the student ministry more closely with the objectives of the diocese and to promote the addition of new Catholic lay organizations, including Opus Dei and Courage International.

Fernandes affirmed to the Dicastery for Divine Worship and the Discipline of the Sacraments the prior request of Bishop Brennan to elevate St. Mary of the Assumption in Lancaster, Ohio, to a minor basilica. On July 7, 2022, Cardinal Arthur Roche bestowed the title of minor basilica upon St. Mary.

Distinctions

Foreign orders 

 : Knight of the Order of the Holy Sepulchre

See also

 Catholic Church hierarchy
 Catholic Church in the United States
 Historical list of the Catholic bishops of the United States
 List of Catholic bishops of the United States
 Lists of patriarchs, archbishops, and bishops

References

External links

Roman Catholic Diocese of Columbus Official Site
Roman Catholic Archdiocese of Cincinnati Official Site

Episcopal succession

Living people
1972 births
People from Toledo, Ohio
American Roman Catholic priests
American people of Goan descent
University of Toledo alumni
Catholics from Ohio
21st-century Roman Catholic bishops in the United States
Bishops appointed by Pope Francis
Roman Catholic bishops of Columbus